The Renshaw ministry was the 61st ministry of the New South Wales Government, and was led by the 31st Premier, Jack Renshaw, of the Labor Party. The ministry was the only occasion when the Government was led by Renshaw, as Premier.

Renshaw was elected to the New South Wales Legislative Assembly in 1941 and served continuously until 1980, representing the seat of Castlereagh. Having served as the Secretary for Lands in the third McGirr ministry, Renshaw was promoted as the Secretary for Public Works and Minister for Local Government in the first and second Cahill ministries. He then served as the Minister for Local Government and the Minister for Highways in the third and fourth Cahill ministries. When Bob Heffron became Premier in 1959, Renshaw was elected as his Deputy, serving variously as the Treasurer, the Minister for Lands, the Minister for Agriculture, and the Minister for Industrial Development and Decentralisation in the first and second Heffron ministries. When Heffron resigned as Labor Leader in April 1964, Renshaw was elected to lead Labor and became Premier.

This ministry covers the period from 30 April 1964 until 13 May 1965, when the Renshaw-led Labor Government was defeated at the 1965 state election by the Liberal-Country coalition led by Robert Askin and Charles Cutler; ending twenty-four consecutive years of Labor government in New South Wales under William McKell, McGirr, Cahill, Heffron and Renshaw.

Composition of ministry

The composition of the ministry was announced by Premier Renshaw following his appointment as Premier on 30 April 1964, and covers the period until 13 May 1965, when Renshaw's Labor-led government was defeated. Ministers are listed in order of seniority and in all cases, serve the full term of this ministry.

 
Ministers are members of the Legislative Assembly unless otherwise noted.

See also

Members of the New South Wales Legislative Assembly, 1962–1965
Members of the New South Wales Legislative Council, 1961–1964
Members of the New South Wales Legislative Council, 1964–1967

Notes

References

 

New South Wales ministries
1964 establishments in Australia
1965 disestablishments in Australia